Oostkerke (Dutch, 'East church') is a town in Diksmuide, West Flanders, Belgium.

External links
Oostkerke @ City Review

Populated places in West Flanders
Sub-municipalities of Diksmuide